What the World Needs Now: The Music of Burt Bacharach is an album by McCoy Tyner released on the Impulse! label in 1997. It was recorded in March 1996 and features performances of Burt Bacharach's compositions by Tyner with bassist Christian McBride, drummer Lewis Nash a string section and orchestra. The Allmusic review by Scott Yanow states that "The pianist treats each melody as if it were precious, and the overall results are rather schlocky".

Track listing
 "(They Long to Be) Close to You" - 7:51  
 "What the World Needs Now Is Love" - 6:09  
 "You'll Never Get to Heaven (If You Break My Heart)" - 5:04  
 "The Windows of the World" - 5:30  
 "One Less Bell to Answer" - 5:39  
 "A House is Not a Home" - 5:36  
 "(There's) Always Something There to Remind Me" - 4:43  
 "Alfie" - 4:26  
 "The Look of Love - 7:10  
All compositions by Burt Bacharach
Recorded at The Hit Factory, NYC, March 5 & 6, 1996

Personnel
McCoy Tyner - piano
Christian McBride - bass
Lewis Nash - drums 
John Clayton - arranger, conductor

References

McCoy Tyner albums
1997 albums
Impulse! Records albums